Tankei (湛慶 1173 – June 13, 1256) was a Japanese sculptor of the Kei school, which flourished in the Kamakura period. He was the student of and eldest son of the master sculptor Unkei.

Famous Works
Statue of Sahasrabhuja-arya-avalokiteśvara in the temple known as Sanjusangen-dō in Kyoto.
The statue of Ugyō, one of the Niō guardians at the Nandaimon in front of the temple Tōdai-ji in Nara, with Jōkaku and 12 assistant sculptors.

References
 Hiromichi Soejima, « Japan, §V: Sculpture > (iv) Kamakura period (1185–1333) » [archive], Oxford Art Online, université d’Oxford. Consulté le 3 août 2012
 Hisashi Mōri, Sculpture of the Kamakura period, vol. 11, Weatherhill, coll. « Heibonsha Survey of Japanese Art », 1974, p. 70
 Victor Harris et Ken Matsushima, Kamakura: the renaissance of Japanese sculpture 1185–1333, British Museum Press, 2010, p. 36-37

Kei school
1173 births
1256 deaths
Japanese sculptors
People of Heian-period Japan
People of Kamakura-period Japan
Heian period Buddhists
Kamakura period Buddhists